Ramularius is a genus of beetles in the family Cerambycidae, containing the following species:

 Ramularius brunneus Breuning, 1967
 Ramularius pygmaeus Aurivillius, 1908
 Ramularius unicolor Breuning, 1940
 Ramularius uniformis (Breuning, 1939)

References

Apomecynini